A bosque is a forested area that forms on the flood plains of a river or stream; typically in the southwestern United States, from a Spanish word for woodlands.

Bosque may also refer to:

Business, media and entertainment
 Bosque (journal), a scientific forestry journal published by the Southern University of Chile
 Bosque (programming language), designed and developed by Microsoft
 "Bosque", a 2022 song by No Money Enterprise featuring Bently, Vita and Redback

Places
 Bosque River, Texas, U.S.
 Bosque County, Texas
 Bosque, New Mexico, Valencia County, U.S.
 Bosque School, a preparatory school in Albuquerque, Bernalillo County, New Mexico, U.S.

Other uses
 Bosques de las Lomas, a section of Mexico (City), D.F., United Mexican States
 Ulmus parvifolia 'UPMTF', a Chinese Elm cultivar sold under the marketing name Bosque

See also
Bosquentin, France
Bosquet, a formal plantation of trees
Buskett Gardens, a woodland area in Malta
El Bosque (disambiguation)
Basque (disambiguation)